Yann Tainguy (born 24 August 1955) is a French admiral,  commanding officer for the Mediterranean maritime defence zone and Maritime Prefect for the Mediterranean.

Sources and references 

 Amiral Yann Tainguy, Préfecture maritime de la Méditerranée

Living people
French Navy admirals
1955 births
Officiers of the Légion d'honneur